American refugees refers to refugees that are from or chose to reside in the United States, such as:

Refugees from the United States
 "Black Refugee", African-American slaves who fled to Canada during the War of 1812.
 Exodusters, African Americans fleeing to Kansas after the Reconstruction Era.
 "Loyalist refugees", loyalist refugees expelled after the American Revolution.
 Underground Railroad, networks of slaves fleeing to Canada.
 Vietnam War resisters in Canada, Americans fleeing military service in Canada.
 Vietnam War resisters in Sweden, Americans fleeing military service in Sweden.

Refugees in the United States
 Asylum in the United States, American policy of accepting refugees.

American refugees